In enzymology, a NADH peroxidase is an enzyme that catalyzes the chemical reaction

NADH + H+ + H2O2  NAD+ + 2 H2O

The presumed function of NADH peroxidase is to inactivate H2O2 generated within the cell, for example by glycerol-3-phosphate oxidase during glycerol metabolism or dismutation of superoxide, before the H2O2 causes damage to essential cellular components.

The 3 substrates of this enzyme are NADH, H+, and H2O2, whereas its two products are NAD+ and H2O. It employs one cofactor, FAD, however no discrete FADH2 intermediate has been observed.

This enzyme belongs to the family of oxidoreductases, specifically those acting on a peroxide as acceptor (peroxidases).  The systematic name of this enzyme class is NADH:hydrogen-peroxide oxidoreductase. Other names in common use include DPNH peroxidase, NAD peroxidase, diphosphopyridine nucleotide peroxidase, NADH-peroxidase, nicotinamide adenine dinucleotide peroxidase, and NADH2 peroxidase.

Structure 

The crystal structure of NADH peroxidase resembles glutathione reductase with respect to chain fold and location as well as conformation of the prosthetic group FAD

His10 of the NADH peroxidase is located near the N-terminus of the R1 helix within the FAD-binding site.  One of the oxygen atoms of Cys42-SO3H is hydrogen-bonded both to the His10 imidazole and to Cys42 N terminus. The His10 functions in part to stabilize the unusual Cys42-SOH redox center. Arg303 also stabilizes the Cys42-SO3H. Glu-14 participates in forming the tight dimer interface that limits solvent accessibility, important for maintaining the oxidation state of the sulfenic acid.

Reaction mechanism 

The NADH peroxidase from Enterococcus faecalis is unique in that it utilizes the Cys42 thiol/sulfenic acid (-SH/-SOH) redox couple in the heterolytic cleavage of the peroxide bond to catalyze the two-electron reduction of hydrogen peroxide to water.

The kinetic mechanism of the wild-type peroxidase involves (1) NADH reduction of E(FAD, Cys42-SOH) to EH2(FAD, Cys42-SH) in an initial priming step; (2) rapid binding of NADH to EH2; (3) reduction of H2O2 by the Cys42-thiolate, yielding E•NADH; and (4) rate-limiting hydride transfer from bound NADH, regenerating EH2. No discrete FADH2 intermediate has been observed, however, and the precise details of Cys42-SOH reduction have not been elucidated.

 E + NADH → (EH2'•NAD+)* → EH2'•NAD+ → EH2 + NAD+ + H2O
 EH2 + NADH → EH2•NADH*
 EH2•NADH* + H2O2 → E•NADH + H2O
 E•NADH + H+ → EH2•NAD+ + H2O
 EH2•NAD+ → EH2 + NAD+

Inhibitors include Ag+, Cl−, Co2+, Cu2+, Hg2+, NaN3, Pb2+, and SO42−. At suboptimal H2O2 concentrations and concentrations of NADH that are saturating, NADH inhibits the peroxidase activity of the NADH peroxidase by converting the enzyme to an unstable intermediate. NAD+ behaves as an activator by reversing the equilibria that lead to the unstable intermediate, thus converting the enzyme to the kinetically active complex that reduces H2O2.

Biological Function

NADH eliminates potentially toxic hydrogen peroxide under aerobic growth conditions and represents an enzymatic defense available against H2O2-mediated oxidative stress. Second, the enzyme presents an additional mechanism for regeneration of the NAD+ essential to the strictly fermentative metabolism of this organism. The enzyme may also protect against exogenous H2O2 and contribute to bacterial virulence.

The actual function of NADH peroxidases and oxidases in plants is still unclear, but they could act in early signaling of oxidative stress through producing H2O2.

An alternative role may include regulation of H2O2 formation by NADH peroxidase and oxidase in cell wall loosening and reconstruction.

References

EC 1.11.1
NADPH-dependent enzymes
NADH-dependent enzymes
Flavoproteins
Enzymes of known structure